The Cathedral Basilica of the Holy Family  also called Częstochowa Cathedral is a religious building that is affiliated with the Catholic Church and was built in the neo-Gothic style, it is a three-nave church following the Roman or Latin rite and is located on the street Krakowska in the city of Częstochowa in Poland.

It is one of the largest of its kind in Europe, built on an old cemetery in the years 1825-1898. It was built between 1901 and 1927 and designed by Konstanty Wojciechowski. The temple in 1925 became the cathedral of the diocese of Częstochowa, and since 1992 is the metropolitan church of the ecclesiastical province of Czestochowa. The facade of the basilica is north; opposite the John Paul II Square (formerly Cathedral Square). In the Chapel of Our Lady of Czestochowa there is a crypt of the local bishops.

See also
Roman Catholicism in Poland
Cathedral Basilica of the Holy Family

References

Roman Catholic cathedrals in Poland
Buildings and structures in Częstochowa
Roman Catholic churches completed in 1898
Basilica churches in Poland
19th-century Roman Catholic church buildings in Poland